Shelley is a closed station located in the town of Shelley, on the Cudgewa railway line in Victoria, Australia. It was the highest railway station in Victoria, at 781 metres (2562 feet). Nothing remains of the station today.

The passenger platform was shortened from 61m to 38.5m in 1976.

References

Disused railway stations in Victoria (Australia)
Shire of Towong